The 2009 FIFA Club World Cup (officially known as the FIFA Club World Cup UAE 2009 presented by Toyota for sponsorship reasons) was a football tournament played from 9 to 19 December 2009. It was the sixth FIFA Club World Cup and was played in Abu Dhabi, United Arab Emirates.

Defending champions Manchester United did not qualify as they lost the 2009 UEFA Champions League Final to Barcelona, who went on to win the Club World Cup for the first time. After coming from behind to beat Mexican side Atlante in the semi-finals, they did the same against the South American entrants, Estudiantes, in the final, winning 2–1 after extra time. Mauro Boselli put Estudiantes ahead in the 37th minute, but Pedro equalised with a minute left in normal time before Lionel Messi scored the winning goal five minutes into the second half of extra time.

This win made Barcelona the first Spanish side to win the Club World Cup, and it also meant that they had won six competitions in the 2009 calendar year, beating Liverpool's European record of five trophies won in 2001.

Host bids
On 13 August 2007, FIFA announced that an open tender for the bidding process for the 2009 tournament would be opened in November 2007. The FIFA Executive Committee appointed the United Arab Emirates as hosts for the 2009 and 2010 tournaments on 27 May 2008 during their meeting in Sydney, Australia. Australia, Japan and Portugal also placed bids to host the tournament, but Portugal later withdrew from the process.

Qualified teams

Venues

All of the matches at the tournament were played in Abu Dhabi, with three matches at the Mohammed bin Zayed Stadium and five at the Zayed Sports City Stadium, including the final and the play-offs for third and fifth place.

Match ball
The Adidas Jabulani, the official match ball of the 2010 FIFA World Cup, served as the match ball of the 2009 FIFA Club World Cup.

Match officials

Squads

Matches
The official draw was held in Abu Dhabi on 12 November 2009 to decide the opposition to be faced by the three teams that begin the tournament at the quarter-final stage.

All times are local, GST (UTC+4).

Play-off for quarter-finals

Quarter-finals

Semi-finals

Match for fifth place

Match for third place

Final

Goalscorers

Prize money
 Winners: $5 million
 Runners-up: $4 million
 Third place: $2.5 million
 Fourth place: $2 million
 Fifth place: $1.5 million
 Sixth place: $1 million
 Seventh place: $0.5 million
 Total: $16.5 million

Awards

References

External links

FIFA Club World Cup UAE 2009, FIFA.com
2009 FIFA Club World Cup Official Site (Archived)
FIFA Technical Report

 
2009
2009
2009 in association football
2009–10 in Spanish football
2009–10 in Emirati football
2009–10 in Mexican football
2009–10 in Argentine football
2009 in South Korean football
2009–10 in New Zealand association football
Foo